The 2017 Indy Lights season was the 32nd season of the Indy Lights open wheel motor racing series and the 16th sanctioned by IndyCar, acting as the primary support series for the IndyCar Series. A 16-race schedule was announced on September 14, 2016. The schedule included a stop at Gateway Motorsports Park for the first time since 2003. This replaced the race at Phoenix International Raceway after it returned to the schedule for only a single season. The Mazda Raceway Laguna Seca round to end the season was omitted, as it was for the other Road to Indy series.

American Kyle Kaiser driving for Juncos Racing led a steady campaign where he finished every lap of the season in a season where no particular team or driver was dominant and in doing so essentially clinched the championship with one round remaining (he only had to start the final round). Kaiser won three races with an additional three podium finishes. Santiago Urrutia struggled during the first half of the season but logged six podium finishes in the last seven races, including two wins, to vault his way to second in the championship. Colton Herta won six poles, but was only able to convert that to two wins and he finished third in the championship. Brazilian rookie Matheus Leist had a brilliant stretch of races in the middle of the season, capturing three wins, but was otherwise unremarkable and wound up fourth. Zachary Claman DeMelo won a single race and finished fifth in points while 2016 Pro Mazda Championship winner Aaron Telitz bookended the season with his only two wins and finished sixth. Nico Jamin won three races but also suffered four DNFs and fell to seventh in points. Juan Piedrahita captured his first Indy Lights pole at Gateway Motorsports Park, his 57th Indy Lights start.

Team and driver chart
 All drivers compete in Cooper Tire–shod Dallara chassis with Mazda AER engines.

Schedule

Race results

1Qualifying canceled due to weather and grid was set on points

Championship standings

Drivers' championship

Scoring system

 The driver who qualified on pole was awarded one additional point.
 An additional point was awarded to the driver who led the most laps in a race.
 The driver who obtained the fastest lap in a race was awarded one additional point.

 Ties in points broken by number of wins, or best finishes.

Teams' championship

References

External links 

 

Indy Lights seasons
Indy Lights
Indy Lights